The Motherland Party (abbreviated as ANAVATAN, formerly ANAP) is a political party in Turkey. It was founded in 1983 by Turgut Özal. It merged with the Democratic Party in October 2009, but in the September of 2011 the party was re-established again. Its current president is İbrahim Çelebi.

The ANAP was considered a centre-right neoliberal, conservative and nationalist party that supported restrictions on the role that government can play in the economy and also supported private capital and enterprise and some public expressions of religion. The 1983 Turkish general election was won by the new Motherland Party, led by Özal. Although the party was composed of a potentially disruptive mixture of Islamic revivalist and secular liberals, he was able to form a majority government, and briefly, democracy was restored.

History

Foundation 
ANAP was founded on 20 May 1983. Party's founders are: Turgut Özal, Cavit Şadi Pehlivanoğlu, Mehmet Keçeciler, Mesut Yılmaz, Cavit Kavak, Adnan Kahveci, Cemil Çiçek, Ali Ayağ, Mustafa Taşar, Kaya Erdem, Güneş Taner, Abdullah Tenekeci, Kazım Oksay, Recep Ercüment Konukman, Veysel Atasoy, Halil Şıvgın, Vehbi Dinçerler, Sudi Türel, Necat Eldem, Ali Tanrıyar, Bedrettin Doğancan Akyürek, İbrahim Özdemir, Abdulhalim Aras, Hüsnü Doğan, Leyla Yeniay Köseoğlu, Vural Arıkan, Bedrettin Dalan, Abdülhalim Aras, Nail Kul.

1983 general elections 
In the National Assembly elections on 6 November 1983, the Populist Party and the Motherland party were allowed to run for office. The ANAP won 212 of the 400 available seats and Turgut Özal, the leader of the party, became the Prime Minister. The ANAP maintained a majority in the government of Turkey from 1983 until 1991. Turgut Özal held the position of Prime Minister from 1983 to 1989, then President from 1989 to 1993. Özal died in office, and was succeeded by the True Path Party leader, Süleyman Demirel.

After the 1983 National assembly, ANAP allowed all political parties to participate in the local elections.

1987 referendum and general elections 
With the 1987 Turkish constitutional referendum, despite ANAP campaigning against it, a 10-year ban on over 200 leaders of the Republican People's Party and Justice Party were lifted, allowing them to run for office and participate in political affairs. In 1987 Turkish general election ANAP won 292 of the 450 seats.

During this time, the ANAP leaders transformed the Turkish economy by beginning free-market reforms, particularly cutting down the public area and moving towards privately owned business. In 1987, the ANAP-led government filed for admission into the European Economic Community, the forerunner of the European Union. However, this attempt to enter the EEC was ended when the ANAP criticized the customs union of the EEC and decided the admission terms prescribed by the EEC to be not in the best interest of Turkey or its people.

1991 general elections 
In 1991 Turkish general election, ANAP lost the majority to a coalition of the True Path Party and Social Democratic Populist Party.

1995 general elections 
After its longest run, the ANAP has had few opportunities to return to leadership. After the 1995 Turkish general election, ANAP formed a brief coalition with the True Path Party (DYP), another center-right oriented party, that allowed their influence to return for a short period of time. Then, from July 1997 to November 1998, the ANAP was returned to the head of government with the leader Mesut Yılmaz during Turkey's first televised elections.

1999 general elections 
However, the ANAP suffered one of the largest defeats during the April 1999 elections and became the fourth largest political party in Turkey with only 14% of the votes. Following these elections, ANAP received only 86 of 365 seats in the Parliament.

2002 general elections 
During the 2002 elections, they got only 5.12% of the votes and no seats in Parliament.

On 5 May 2007, it was announced that ANAP and True Path Party would merge to the Democratic Party (DP). However, this failed and ANAP announced that it would not run for the upcoming elections.

From 2008 to 2009, its president was Salih Uzun. On 31 October 2009, it was merged to Democratic Party.

Re-establishment 
On 11 September 2011, the party was re-established, with the same ideology as the first organization. Its current president is İbrahim Çelebi.

On 9 March 2023, a pro-Erdoğan journalist, Mahmut Övür claimed that ANAP will join the People's Alliance.

Leaders
The chief executive member of the party is called the Genel Başkan. He/She is elected by party delegates in biennial party congresses. The party had seven leaders since its foundation in 1983 until 2009:

 Turgut Özal (May 20, 1983 – October 31, 1989)
 Yıldırım Akbulut (November 16, 1989 – June 15, 1991)
 Mesut Yılmaz (June 15, 1991 – November 4, 2002)
 Ali Talip Özdemir (November 18, 2002 – October 3, 2003)
 Nesrin Nas (October 15, 2003 – March 21, 2005)
 Erkan Mumcu (April 2, 2005 – October 26, 2008)
 Salih Uzun (October 26, 2008 – October 31, 2009)

(During periods between the resignation or incapacitation of a leader and the election of a new one, the central committee of the party collectively acted as leader.)

Election results

General elections

References

Further reading
 "Country Profile: Turkey." MSN Encarta

External links
 

 
Political parties in Turkey
2011 establishments in Turkey